The 2017 Major League Baseball (MLB) First-Year Player Draft began on June 12, 2017. The draft assigned amateur baseball players to MLB teams. The first 36 picks, including the first round and compensatory picks, were broadcast on MLB Network on June 12, while the remainder of the draft was live streamed on MLB.com on June 13 and 14.

With the worst record in the 2016 MLB season, the Minnesota Twins received the first overall pick. Compensation picks were distributed for players who did not sign from the 2016 MLB Draft. Also, fourteen small-market teams competed in a lottery for additional competitive balance picks, with six teams receiving an additional pick after the first round, and eight teams receiving an additional pick after the second round. The Twins selected Royce Lewis with the first overall selection.

First round selections

Compensatory round

Competitive Balance Round A

Other notable selections

Notes
Compensation picks

References

External links
2017 Major League Baseball draft Official Site

Major League Baseball draft
Draft
Major League Baseball draft
Major League Baseball draft
Baseball in New Jersey
Events in New Jersey
Sports in Hudson County, New Jersey
Secaucus, New Jersey